Carlos Zárate Serna (born May 23, 1951) is a Mexican former professional boxer who competed from 1970 to 1988, and held the WBC bantamweight title from 1976 to 1979. He and fellow Mexican and world Bantamweight champion Rubén Olivares have the distinction of being the only two professional boxers in history to put together two streaks of 20 or more knockout wins in a row.

Zárate was voted Fighter of the Year by The Ring magazine in 1977. Zárate was ranked #21 in The Ring's list of 100 greatest punchers of all time. and voted as the #1 bantamweight (along with Rubén Olivares) of the 20th century by the Associated Press in 1999. In 1994, Zárate was inducted into the International Boxing Hall of Fame.  He is also the father of once-defeated Light Welterweight prospect, Carlos Zárate, Jr.

Personal life
Carlos Zárate has family members who have followed him into boxing. His son Carlos, now retired, fought in the Light Welterweight division and his nephew, Joel Luna Zárate, is the former WBO Latino Super Flyweight champion.

Amateur career
Zárate, considered along with rival Wilfredo Gómez to be among the better punchers of the lighter divisions, had an amateur record of 33 wins and 3 losses, with 30 knockout wins, and he won the Mexican Golden Gloves, or Guantes de Oro, in 1969.

Professional career
In 1970, Carlos made his professional debut with a 2-round knockout win over Luis Castañeda in Cuernavaca. That marked the beginning of a 23-fight knockout winning streak. The only boxers to get past the third round during that streak were Al Torres and Antonio Castañeda, who lasted 5 and 9 rounds respectively, both at Tijuana. Víctor Ramírez became the first boxer to last the distance with Zárate when Zárate beat him on points in January 1974 in Mexico City over ten rounds. Next began his second 20 plus knockout wins in a row streak, when none of his next 28 opponents heard the final bell on their feet.

WBC Bantamweight championship
After knocking out former world title challenger Néstor Jiménez in two rounds at Mexicali to end 1975, the WBC made Zárate their number one challenger at the Bantamweight division. So, after beating César Desiga by a knockout in four on March 29, 1976, in Monterrey, Zárate was faced on the night of May 8 of that year with defending WBC Bantamweight Champion Rodolfo Martínez in Los Angeles. Zárate became a world Bantamweight champion by knocking his countryman out in the eighth round. Zárate next won two fights by a knockout in the second and then defended it against Paul Ferreri, who lost by knockout in 12 in Los Angeles too. He finished '76 with a four-round knockout over Waruinge Nakayama in a title defense held at Culiacán.

Fight against WBA Bantamweight champion
Main article:The Battle of the Z Boys

After beginning 1977 with a third-round knockout win over Colombia's Fernando Cabanela in Mexico City, Mexican boxing fans started talking about a possible unification bout between him and fellow Mexican Alfonso Zamora, the WBA's world Bantamweight champion. Nicknamed by the American boxing press as The Z Boys, the two did square off, but not before much hassle and hurdle putting by both the WBC and WBA, who wanted both boxers to pay a large amount of money before sanctioning the bout. So, the California state boxing commission decided to sanction it as a ten-round, non-title bout instead. Fans didn't seem to care that no world title belt would be involved that afternoon, and they packed the fight venue when Zárate and Zamora met in the LA suburb of Inglewood, California, at the Forum on April 23 of '77. Zárate made the tactical mistake of going toe to toe with a shorter but harder hitting puncher. Zárate got tagged repeatedly and then a man wearing a white tank top and grey sweat pants entered the ring. The fight was momentarily stopped by referee Richard Steele and a contingent of helmeted policemen stormed the ring, forcibly removing the intruder thereafter, Zárate managed to stay away from Zamora. After a first round, Zárate the better boxer, with a reach advantage stayed away and outboxed Zamora wearing him down then knocking him out in four to gain recognition by most boxing fans as the undisputed world champion of the Bantamweights. Then, he retained the WBC title with a knockout in six over Danilo Batista, and finished 1977 with a trip to Spain, where he retained the belt against challenger Juan Francisco Rodríguez, beaten in five.

In 1978, Zárate started out by meeting future world champion Alberto Dávila, whom he knocked out in eight at Los Angeles to retain his belt. Then, in April of that year, he made his first of two trips to Puerto Rico that year, to fight challenger Andres Hernandez, who lasted until the 13th. round at San Juan's Roberto Clemente coliseum.

Zárate vs. Gómez
Main article:Wilfredo Gomez versus Carlos Zarate

After retaining the title against Emilio Hernandez by a knockout in four and winning a non-title bout, Zárate announced he was moving up in weight and challenging the WBC Super Bantamweight champion, Wilfredo Gómez. According to many experts and the Ring Magazine book The Ring: Boxing In The 20th Century, Gómez and Zárate had the highest knockout win percentage of any two boxers paired inside a ring in history: When Gómez and Zárate met on October 28, also at Roberto Clemente Coliseum in San Juan, the challenger and still world Bantamweight champion Zárate was 52–0 with 51 knockouts, while defending world Super Bantamweight champion Gómez was 21-0-1 with 21 knockouts. Zárate went to the floor four times and tasted the sour taste of defeat for the first time in his career when he was beaten by a knockout in five rounds.

Return to Bantamweight
In 1979, Zárate made what would turn out to be his last successful defense, with a third-round knockout win over Mensah Kpalongo in Los Angeles. After winning a non-title bout against Celso Cháirez by a knockout in five in Houston, Texas, Zárate met gym-mate Lupe Pintor in Las Vegas and lost a close and controversial 15-round decision. Enraged by losing a decision he (as well as many fans) thought undeserved, he announced his retirement from boxing and vowed never to fight as a professional again.

Five year retirement
Zárate spent five years in retirement, but the temptation of the public adulation boxers receive when they become champions and the aroma of the boxing ring led him back into competition as a boxer. Despite still retaining an acceptable amount of his boxing ability, Zárate was nonetheless, a shadow of what he was before his 5-year retirement. In his return bout in 1986 against Adam García, he won a four-round decision. 11 more victories in a row, all by knockout, including one over then number one world Super Bantamweight challenger Richard Savage (knocked out by Zárate in five in Mexico City), made him the WBC's number one challenger at the Super Bantamweight division once again.

And so, in October 1987, he traveled to Australia to meet the man boxing fans consider to be the greatest Australian world champion of all time: Jeff Fenech. In a fight contested for Fenech's world Super Bantamweight title, Zárate lost by a four-round technical decision. After Fenech vacated the title soon after to pursue the world Featherweight crown, Zárate and countryman Daniel Zaragoza met for the vacant world championship belt, but Zárate came back on the losing end once again, being knocked out in the tenth round and finally announcing his retirement for good.

During the 1990s he also became a member of the International Boxing Hall Of Fame, and in 2003, he and Wilfredo Gómez met at a boxing undercard in Puerto Rico to commemorate the 25th anniversary of their boxing bout.

He had a record of 66 wins and 4 losses as a professional boxer, with 63 wins by knockout.

Carlos Zárate was voted as the Greatest Bantamweight Ever in 2014 by the Houston Boxing Hall Of Fame. The HBHOF is a voting body composed entirely of current and former fighters.

Professional boxing record

See also
Notable boxing families
List of WBC world champions
List of Mexican boxing world champions

References

External links
 

1951 births
Living people
Bantamweight boxers
Super-bantamweight boxers
Boxers from Mexico City
World boxing champions
World bantamweight boxing champions
World Boxing Council champions
World Boxing Association champions
International Boxing Hall of Fame inductees
Mexican male boxers